This is a compilation of every international soccer game played by the United States men's national soccer team from 1950 through 1959. It includes the team's record for that year, each game and the date played. It also lists the U.S. goal scorers.

The format is: home team listed first, U.S. listed first at home or neutral site.

Records are in win–loss–tie format. Games decided in penalty kicks are counted as ties, as per the FIFA standard.

1950

1951

1952

1953

1954

1955

1956

1957

1958

1959

See also
United States at the FIFA World Cup

External links
 USA - Details of International Matches 1885-1969
 USA Men's National Team: All-time Results, 1885-1989
 U.S. SOCCER FEDERATION 2016 MEN’S NATIONAL TEAM MEDIA GUIDE

1950
1949–50 in American soccer
1950–51 in American soccer
1951–52 in American soccer
1952–53 in American soccer
1953–54 in American soccer
1955–56 in American soccer
1957–58 in American soccer
1958–59 in American soccer
1959–60 in American soccer